Akdeniz University is a public research university established in Antalya, Turkey. It has been chosen as the second most beautiful university in Turkey, after Boğaziçi University, with its campus having a wide and green land and being 15 minutes away from Konyaaltı Beach.

It is one of the leading educational institutions in the country with its Faculty of Medicine, Faculty of Law, and Faculty of Economics and Administrative Sciences. The university, where the first face transplant was performed, created a revolution in the history of medicine. It is the 7th best public university in Turkey. Based on its academic studies, it is the 5th university with the most academic articles. Its success in the Public Personnel Selection Examination (KPSS) is above Turkey's average.

Akdeniz University gave its units in Isparta to Süleyman Demirel University, which was established in 1992; in Burdur to Mehmet Akif Ersoy University, which was established in 2006; and in Alanya to Alanya Alaaddin Keykubat University, which was established in 2015.

It continues its education and research activities in 24 faculties, 7 institutes, 3 colleges, 1 conservatory, 12 vocational colleges and 57 research and application centers. It is also a member of the European University Association and the Caucasus University Association.

In the 2021-22 academic year, a total of 64.335 students were studying, as 21.513 associate degree, 37.389 undergraduate, 3.893 master's and 1.540 doctorate students. As of 2022, a total of 2.829 academic personnel, 540 professors, 314 associate professors, 491 doctors, 674 lecturers and 810 research assistants, were working within the scope of the university.

Academics

Faculties 

 Faculty of Dentistry

 Faculty of Literature

 Faculty of Education

 Faculty of Science

 Faculty of Fine Arts

 Faculty of Nursing

 Faculty of Law

 Faculty of Economics and Administrative Sciences

 Faculty of Theology

 Faculty of Communication

 Kemer Faculty of Maritime

 Kumluca Faculty of Health Sciences

 Manavgat Faculty of Social Sciences and Humanities

 Manavgat Faculty of Tourism

 Faculty of Architecture

 Faculty of Engineering

 Faculty of Health Sciences

 Serik Faculty of Business Administration

 Faculty of Sports Sciences

 Faculty of Fisheries

 Faculty of Medicine

 Faculty of Tourism

 Faculty of Applied Sciences

 Faculty of Agriculture

Institutes 

 Mediterranean Civilizations Research Institute

 Institute of Education Sciences

 Graduate Institute of Natural and Applied Sciences

 Fine Arts Institute

 Prof. Dr. Tuncer Karpuzoğlu Organ Transplantation Institute

 Health Sciences Institute

 Social Sciences Institute

Colleges 

 College of Tourism and Hotel Management

 Turkish Teaching Application and Research Center (TOMER)

 College of Foreign Languages

Conservatory 

 Antalya State Conservatory

Vocational Schools 

 Vocational School of Justice

 Demre Dr. Hasan Ünal Vocational School

 Elmalı Vocational School

 Finike Vocational School

 Göynük Culinary Arts Vocational School

 Korkuteli Vocational School

 Kumluca Vocational School

 Manavgat Vocational School

 Vocational School of Health Services

 Serik Gülsün-Süleyman Süral Vocational School

 Vocational School of Social Sciences

 Vocational School of Technical Sciences

Achievements
On January 21, 2011, Turkish surgeon Dr. Ömer Özkan and his team successfully performed the country’s first-ever full face transplant at the university's hospital in Antalya. The 19-year-old patient, Uğur Acar's face was badly burnt in a house fire when he was a baby. The donor was 39-year-old Ahmet Kaya, who died on January 20. The surgery team accomplished at the same time another transplant, a double-arm and one-leg limb transplant, on Atilla Kavdı using the organs of the same donor.

Surgeon Dr. Ömer Özkan performed on May 16, 2012 with his team country's fourth face and their second full face transplant. The face and ears of the 27-year-old patient Turan Çolak from Izmir was burnt as he fell into an oven when he was three and half years old. The donor was Tevfik Yılmaz, a 19-year young man from Uşak, who had attempted suicide on May 8. He was declared brain dead in the evening hours of May 15 after having been in intensive care station for seven days.

Affiliations
The university is a member of the European University Association and involved in international relations and projects such as Leonardo and Erasmus. The university is a member of the Caucasus University Association.

Notable people

Alumni
 Azize Tanrıkulu (born 1986), 2008 Olympic silver medalist and European champion Turkish female taekwondo athlete
 Bahri Tanrıkulu (born 1980), 2004 Olympic silver medalist and multiple World and European champion Turkish taekwondo athlete
 Barış Eyriboz (born 1976), Turkish film director, screenwriter and producer
 Burak Yeter, Turkish DJ, record producer and remixer.

Faculty
 Mustafa Kalemli (born 1943), Turkish physician and politician, who served as the Speaker of the parliament
 Ömer Özkan (born 1971), Associate Prof. Dr. at Institute of Plastic, Reconstructive and Aesthetic Surgery, who performed the country's first full face transplant

References

External links 
Official Site

 
Educational institutions established in 1982
Alanya
Buildings and structures in Antalya Province
1982 establishments in Turkey